Marchwiel power station was an electricity generating plant providing a central source of electric current for the Marchwiel Trading Estate near Wrexham. It was under state ownership and operation from 1950 to 1960.

History
The Marchwiel Trading Estate, south east of Wrexham, was developed after the Second World War on the site of a Royal Ordnance Factory. Electricity for the estate was generated by a power station initially operated by the South Wales and Monmouthshire Trading Estates Company Limited. This company was established in 1936 to promote the development of a diverse range of industry in Wales and built several industrial estates.

The British Electricity Authority (BEA) purchased Marchwiel power station from the South Wales Company on 1 October 1950. The BEA developed the station with new plant, but it was divested by the Central Electricity Generating Board (CEGB) in 1960.

Generating plant
The plant comprised:

4 × 50,000 lb/h (6.3 kg/s) John Thompson boilers with chain grate stokers. Steam conditions were 250 psi and 650°F (17.2 bar and 343°C), these supplied steam to:

1 × 7.5 MW Parsons turbo-alternator

1 × 4.65 MW British Thomson-Houston turbo-alternator, commissioned in May 1952

There was also a 260 kW oil engine, house services set.

Condenser cooling was by circulating cooling water plus three wooden Davenport cooling towers each rated at 0.255 million gallons per hour (1159 m3/h), plus one reinforced concrete cooling tower rated at 0.3 million gallons per hour (1364 m3/h); the concrete tower was commissioned in May 1952.

The operating data was as follows:

See also
 List of power stations in Wales
 Wrexham Industrial Estate

References

Demolished power stations in the United Kingdom